Baldacci Family Vineyards is a California winery located in the Stags Leap District AVA of Napa Valley. Founded in 1998, Thomas and Brenda Baldacci were entranced by the beauty of the Napa Valley and the timeless heritage of the Stags Leap District. The generations before had left a deep and abiding affinity for the land from which came not only their livelihood, but their legacy. For the Baldacci’s, family is everything. When they purchased the Stags Leap property, over 18 years ago, Thomas and Brenda knew that they had found a place for their clan to stay connected through the generations. As each new vintage unfolds, they look forward to sharing their wines and their story, with you.

Second generation vintner Michael Baldacci, along with winemaker Ricardo Herrera, create limited production wines from three distinct estate vineyards located in the nested AVA’s of Calistoga, Stags Leap District and Los Carneros. The portfolio reflects the diversity of each estate vineyard with a focus on small lot, premium Cabernet Sauvignon wines. The wines have been favorably reviewed by both Robert Parker (The Wine Advocate) and the Wine Enthusiast over the past 15 years. 

Ricardo Herrera has been the full time winemaker at Baldacci since 2015 and he has worked throughout the years at such iconic wineries as Stag's Leap Wine Cellars, Dominus and Screaming Eagle. Older brother and Consulting Winemaker, Rolando Herrera who used to be cellar master of Stag's Leap Wine Cellars and has worked at Napa Valley wineries Chateau Potelle, Vine Cliffe Winery and Paul Hobbes Wines still provides a guiding hand.

Along with Stags' Leap Winery and others, Baldacci Family Vineyards is a member of the Stags Leap District Winery Association.

History
Tom and his wife Brenda purchased the property in 1998 and for the first few vintages sold their grapes to other area wineries until releasing their own estate wines in 2000. The first viticulturalist for the estate was Oscar Renteria and the first winemaker was John Clanon. The early reviews on Baldacci wines was that they were "European" in style and "food-friendly".

In 2004, the family hired long-time Napa Valley winemaker Rolando Herrera who had been the cellar master of neighboring winery Stag's Leap Wine Cellars, to be the Consulting Winemaker.

Vineyards
The winery owns three estate vineyards located in the Napa Valley sub-appellations of Calistoga, Stags Leap District east of the city of Yountville and Carneros. The most highly acclaimed wine is the barrel selection of Cabernet Sauvignon called Brenda's Vineyard from the Stags Leap District vineyard. This vineyard is located in what Wine Enthusiast Magazine describes as the tenderloin of the Stags Leap District AVA.

Wines
Baldacci Family Vineyards produces an average of 8500 cases of wine a year. All the wines are named after members of the family. In addition to producing Cabernet Sauvignon wines from the Stags Leap District, the winery also makes wines from the Calistoga, Carneros, Russian River and greater Napa Valley American Viticultural Areas (AVAs). The portfolio reflects the vineyard locations with cool climate Chardonnay, Pinot Noir, Gewürztraminer and Syrah coming from Carneros, and Cabernet Sauvignon sourced from Calistoga, Diamond Mountain, Howell Mountain, Oakville, Coombsville and of course the coveted Stags Leap District estate vineyard.

References

Wineries in Napa Valley
1997 establishments in California
American companies established in 1997